Jacaratia is a genus of shrubs or trees in the family Caricaceae. They are native to South and Central America.

Some species of the genus are edible to humans and served in restaurants as a delicacy.

Species
The following species are recognized:

 Jacaratia chocoensis A.H.Gentry & Forero
 Jacaratia corumbensis Kuntze
 Jacaratia digitata (Poepp. & Endl.) Solms
 Jacaratia dolichaula (Donn.Sm.) Woodson
 Jacaratia heptaphylla (Vell.) A.DC.
 Jacaratia mexicana A.DC.
 Jacaratia spinosa (Aubl.) A.DC.

References

Caricaceae
Brassicales genera